Richard Henry Dana Branch, named after Richard Henry Dana, Jr and later known as the Cypress Park Branch, is a former branch library of the Los Angeles Public Library located in the Cypress Park, Los Angeles, California section of Los Angeles, California.  The Georgian Revival style building was built in 1926 based on a design by architect Harry S. Bent.

In 1987, the Richard Henry Dana Branch and several other branch libraries in Los Angeles were added to the National Register of Historic Places as part of a thematic group submission.   The application noted that the branch libraries had been constructed in a variety of period revival styles to house the initial branch library system of the City of Los Angeles.  With respect to the Dana Branch, the application described the building as a charming one-story New England Colonial Revival Style building. It is designed in an L-plan with a high-pitched gable roof.  The portico features paired wood paneled doors with an arched canopy supported by paneled posts.  It was initially creamy green with a deep green roof.
 
In 2001, ground was broken for the construction of a new branch library in Cypress Park.  The new branch, with 35,000 books, several computer stations and a community meeting room, is three times larger than the schoolhouse-type library branch on Pepper Avenue that served Cypress Park since 1927.  There were plans to use the old branch as a senior citizens center.

The old library finally reopened as a community center on December 14, 2015. It has been renamed as The Cypress Park Club House.

See also
List of Registered Historic Places in Los Angeles
Los Angeles Public Library

References

External links
 History of Richard Henry Dana - Cypress Park Branch Library, 1912-1930
 "History of the Richard Henry Dana Library" Oct. 1, 1929
  History of Richard Henry Dana Branch,1912-1936
 "Citizens group formed to fight for library" GREEN SHEET, ca. 1941
 "Moving of Dana Library delayed" TRANSPORTATION UNION NEWS Jul. 26, 1941

Library buildings completed in 1926
Libraries in Los Angeles
Libraries on the National Register of Historic Places in Los Angeles
Georgian Revival architecture in California
Cypress Park, Los Angeles